Gilbert Taylor, B.S.C. (12 April 1914 – 23 August 2013) was a British cinematographer, best known for his work on films such as Dr. Strangelove, A Hard Day's Night (both 1964), Repulsion (1965), The Omen (1976), and Star Wars (1977). In the course of his career, he collaborated with directors like Roman Polanski, Stanley Kubrick, Alfred Hitchcock, and Mike Hodges. He was nominated for two BAFTA Awards, and received a Lifetime Achievement Award from the British Society of Cinematographers.

Early life
The son of a Hertfordshire builder, Taylor grew up in Bushey Heath. A paternal uncle was a newsreel cameraman and contact with him from the age of ten gave Taylor early experience of working with cameras and developing film stock. As a teenager, he studied architecture before deciding to pursue a career in film. While his father disapproved of the film industry, populated he thought by "harridans, whores and gypsies", it was his mother who consented to their son's altered career plans.

A neighbour offered Taylor, aged 15, a job as a camera assistant to William Shenton, a cinematographer working for Gainsborough Studios at their Islington base. In 1929, Taylor worked on the studio's final two silent films. Shenton took Taylor to Paris where he worked on two more silent films, before returning to Gainsborough. He then worked at Elstree for British International Pictures, where he was clapper loader on the Alfred Hitchcock film Number Seventeen (1932). Despite his junior status, formally a second camera assistant, Taylor was entrusted with some of the special effects work, including the use of mattes, to disguise the roofs of poorly-maintained buildings.

During six years service in World War II as an officer in the Royal Air Force Volunteer Reserve, he became an operational cameraman flying in Avro Lancaster bombers, documenting the damage after British bombing raids. Taylor recalled: "This was requested by Winston Churchill, and my material was delivered to 10 Downing Street for him to view. He was keen for the public to see what our lads were doing. I did 10 of those operations, including raids on Cologne and Dresden".

Career 
After demobilisation, he worked for Two Cities Films. In Fame Is the Spur (1947), he worked on a dream sequence using deep focus. The Boulting brothers were the co-producers of the film and they placed Taylor under contract. For the Boultings, Taylor, now promoted to full cinematographer, or director of photography, shot The Guinea Pig (US, The Outsider, 1948), Seven Days to Noon (1950) and High Treason (1951). From this point, Taylor began to use bounced and reflected light gaining a more naturalistic look, whereas the use of direct light was still the common practice by his contemporaries. Because it was necessary for London to look unpopulated in Seven Days to Noon, the first of three "end of the world films" Taylor worked on, it was necessary for him to arise at five-o-clock in the morning during a seven-week shoot.

Kubrick, Lester and Polanski
Taylor worked on a number of films commended for their black and white photography, such as Stanley Kubrick's Dr. Strangelove and Richard Lester's A Hard Day's Night (both 1964). Taylor, without Kubrick who was unwilling to fly in an aircraft, filmed material in the Arctic to be used as background plates in the flying sequences.

He commented later: "Strangelove was at the time a unique experience because the lighting was to be incorporated in the sets, with little or no other light used". Concerning the war room set designed by Ken Adam: "Lighting that set was sheer magic, and I don’t quite know how I got away with it all". He continued: "Much of it was the same formula based on the overheads as fill and blasting in the key on faces from the side". Although Kubrick and Taylor had a rapport, he found the director to be autocratic. An easier project to work on was the Richard Lester film with The Beatles which was heavily improvised.

With Lester, Chris Pizzello wrote in 2003, Taylor "adopted a roving, multiple-camera technique (aided by new, versatile 10:1 zoom lenses) so that the Beatles could move about freely and not worry about technicalities like hitting marks. This fast, fresh brand of filmmaking was a perfect fit for the film’s tiny budget, tight schedule and simple black-and-white aesthetic". Taylor and five other operators on the film used hand-held Arriflex cameras. "The key is not to hold the camera completely still", he once commented "but to let it 'breathe' with you, to move with it".

His work on Dr Strangelove led Roman Polanski to seek Taylor for Repulsion (1965). In committing to the Polish director's first English-language film, Taylor rejected the opportunity to work on a Bond film (Thunderball) because he thought Polanski "was a very interesting guy". According to Polanski in his 1984 autobiography, Repulsions executive producer Michael Klinger "protested that Gil Taylor was one of the most expensive cameramen in the business, but I held out for Taylor and I got him". Taylor said his "aim was to get a stronger negative and good shadows in the final print. The shadows are what make good movies".

Their collaboration continued with Cul-de-sac (1966) and Macbeth (1971), the third and last film he shot with Polanski. According to Ronald Bergan, "although shot in colour", Macbeth, "is as near to black and white as possible, with its grey, misty landscape". Taylor received BAFTA nominations over two consecutive years for the first two collaborations.

Later work in colour
Hitchcock requested Taylor work on his penultimate film Frenzy (1972). Despite a claim in Bergan's obituary of the cinematographer that Hitchcock was unaware the two men had worked together forty years earlier, according to Taylor they had stayed in touch. Hitchcock never looked through the camera, because of his use of storyboards, leaving decisions to Taylor. The tracking shot, up and down a flight of stairs and then into the street, which invisibly merged shots from a studio set and street location took a day to achieve with the switch disguised by the movement of an extra in front of the camera.

Taylor's later films include The Omen (1976), and Star Wars (1977). On Star Wars, he established principles about visual aesthetics which have been maintained in the later films in the series. He told Mark Newbold in 2005: "I wanted to give Star Wars a unique visual style that would distinguish it from other films in the science fiction genre. I wanted Star Wars to have clarity because I think space isn’t out of focus, also I was mindful that there was an enormous amount of process work to be done in America with Dykstra after we had finished shooting in England, and a crisp result would help this process".
Taylor found George Lucas an elusive person to consult, leading Taylor to make his own decisions as how to shoot the picture after multiple readings of the script. Differences of opinion between the director and cinematographer led to 20th Century Fox, for whom Taylor had shot The Omen, intervening to retain him on the picture. After the experience of working on Star Wars, Taylor decided he would never work again with Lucas.

His last film credit was Don't Get Me Started released in 1994, but he continued to work on commercials for some time afterwards.

Taylor was a founder member of the British Society of Cinematographers, receiving their lifetime achievement award in 2001. He received an international award from the American Society of Cinematographers (ASC) in 2006.

Personal life
Taylor met his wife, former script supervisor Dee Vaughan, while both were working on comedian Tony Hancock's film, The Punch and Judy Man (1963), and married in 1967. The couple had a son and daughter. Taylor also had a son and daughter from an earlier marriage. He died on 23 August 2013, aged 99, at his home on the Isle of Wight.

Filmography

As director of photography

 The Guinea Pig (1948)
 Seven Days to Noon (1950)
 Circle of Danger (1951)
 High Treason (1951)
 The Yellow Balloon (1952)
 Single-Handed (1952)
 The Weak and the Wicked (1953)
 Trouble in the Glen (1953)
 Front Page Story (1954)
 The Dam Busters (1955)
 The Silken Affair (1957)
 Woman in a Dressing Gown (1957)
 The Good Companions (1957)
 Ice Cold in Alex (1958)
 She Didn't Say No! (1958)
 No Trees in the Street (1958)
 Alive and Kicking (1959)
 Operation Bullshine (1959)
 Tommy the Toreador (1959)
 Bottoms Up (1960)
 Sands of the Desert (1960)	
 Petticoat Pirates (1961)
 The Rebel/Call Me Genius (1961)
 The Full Treatment / The Treatment (1961)
 A Prize of Arms (1962)
 It's Trad, Dad! / Ring-a-Ding Rhythm (1962)
 Hide and Seek (1963)
 The Punch and Judy Man (1963)
 Dr. Strangelove (1964)
 A Hard Day's Night (1964)
 Ferry Cross the Mersey (1965)
 The Bedford Incident (1965)
 Repulsion (1965)
 Cul-de-sac (1966)
 Theatre of Death / The Female Fiend (1966)
 Work Is a Four-Letter Word (1967)
 The Man Outside (1967)
 A Nice Girl Like Me (1969)
 Before Winter Comes (1969)
 A Day at the Beach (1970)
 The Tragedy of Macbeth / Macbeth (1971)
 Frenzy (1972)
 Soft Beds, Hard Battles / Undercovers Hero (1974)	
 The Omen (1976)
 Star Wars (1977)
 Damien: Omen II (1978)
 Dracula (1979)
 Meetings with Remarkable Men (1979)
 Escape to Athena (1979)
 Flash Gordon (1980)
 Green Ice (1981)
 Venom (1981)
 Losin' It (1983)
 Lassiter (1984)
 Voyage of the Rock Aliens (1984)
 The Bedroom Window (1987)
 Don't Get Me Started (1994)

Television
 The Avengers
episode "A Sense of History" (photography) (1966) 
episode "The Forget-Me-Knot" (1968)
episode "The Curious Case of the Countless Clues" (1968)
episode "Invasion of the Earthmen" (1968)
episode "Split!" (1968)
episode "Get-A-Way!" (1968)
episode "Look - (Stop Me If You've Heard This One) But There Were These Two Fellers..." (1968)
episode "Homicide and Old Lace" (1969)
 Breaking Up (1978)

As television director
 Department S ("The Man from X", 1969)

References

External links

 Profile and interview by the American Society of Cinematographers, on the occasion of his International Achievement Award

1914 births
2013 deaths
British cinematographers
People from Bushey
Royal Air Force officers
Royal Air Force Volunteer Reserve personnel of World War II